Viel is a given name and a surname. Notable persons with that name include:

People with the given name
 Viel Bjerkeset Andersen (born 1963), Norwegian artist

People with the surname
 Alain Viel, French educator
 Cristián Viel (born 1967), Argentine rugby union player
  (born 1971), Chilean actor
 Jean-Marie-Victor Viel (1796–1863), French architect
 Marguerite Viel, French screenwriter and film director
 Mattia Viel (born 1995), Italian cyclist
 Nicolas Viel (died 1625), French missionary
 Placide Viel (1815–1877), French nun and mother general
 Roger Viel (1902–1981), French athlete
 Sabrina Viel (born 1973), Italian ice hockey player
 Tanguy Viel (born 1973), French writer

See also 
 Veel